Llandenny Station was a station along the Coleford, Monmouth, Usk and Pontypool Railway. It was built in 1857, during the construction of the line and was located 8 miles and 52 chains from Monmouth Troy station. It was intended to serve the nearby village of Llandenny, but was closed in May 1955, due to a train drivers strike, the line had meant to have been closed in June but because the strike continued past the lines closing date the last service was on 28 May when the national strike began. A couple of special services ran along the track, including a centenary special organised by the Stephenson Locomotive Society in 1957.

Facilities
The station consisted of a single-storey brick station building with a gable roof and single platform, similar to that of Dingestow. The building was built in two stages, the western section was the original and the eastern was a later extension. There was also a single-storey signal box which was constructed in 1892 and was typical of a late Victorian design.

References

Disused railway stations in Monmouthshire
Former Great Western Railway stations
Railway stations in Great Britain opened in 1857
Railway stations in Great Britain closed in 1955
1857 establishments in Wales